The Alpine Brigade "Cadore" was a light Infantry brigade of the Italian Army, specializing in mountain warfare. Its core units were Alpini, the mountain infantry corps of the Italian Army, that distinguished itself in combat during World War I and World War II. The brigade was based in the Italian provinces of Belluno and Vicenza with its headquarters Belluno. The brigade was disbanded in 1997.

Based in the Cadore Alps of Northern Italy the brigade's coat of arms was modeled after the area's traditional coat of arms.

Constitution 
The Cadore was constituted on 1 July 1953 in the city of Belluno. The brigade’s name alludes to the Cadore Alps in the northernmost part of the province of Belluno. Most of the brigade's recruits came from the north-eastern Veneto Region. The brigade was tasked with defending the Piave valley against an attack by forces of the Warsaw Pact. The brigade’s strength was around 3,600 men and initially it was composed of the:

  Alpine Brigade "Cadore", in Belluno
 Brigade Headquarters, in Belluno
  7th Alpini Regiment, in Belluno
  Command Company, in Belluno
  Alpini Battalion "Pieve di Cadore", in Pieve di Cadore
  Alpini Battalion "Belluno", in Belluno and Agordo
  7th Mortar Company, in Belluno
  6th Mountain Artillery Regiment, in Belluno
  Command Battery, in Belluno
  Mountain Artillery Group "Lanzo", in Belluno
  Mountain Artillery Group "Pieve di Cadore", in Bassano
  Mountain Artillery Group "Agordo", in Feltre
  Anti-aircraft Artillery Group, in Belluno (disbanded in 1957)
  Engineer Company "Cadore", in Belluno
  Signal Company "Cadore", in Belluno

In the following years the brigade was augmented with further units:

  Alpini Battalion "Feltre", in Feltre and Strigno (transferred from the Alpine Brigade "Julia" on 1 June 1956) 
  Alpini Paratroopers Platoon, in Belluno (formed in 1956)
 XIX Alpini Fortification Battalion, in Santo Stefano di Cadore (constituted on 1 January 1957; renamed  Alpini Battalion "Val Cismon" on 1 July 1963)
  Services Grouping "Cadore" (formed from the brigade's supply, maintenance, and logistic units in 1957)
 Light Aircraft Section "Cadore", in Belluno (formed in 1957 and expanded to Light Aircraft Unit "Cadore" in 1966)

The Alpini Paratroopers Platoon merged with the paratrooper platoons of the other four alpine brigades on 1 April 1964 to form the Alpini Paratroopers Company in Bolzano under direct command of the 4th Army Corps. The same year the 7th Mortar Company was disbanded and its mortars and troops divided among the brigade's three Alpini battalions.

1975 Reorganization 

With the 1975 Italian Army reform the regimental level was abolished and battalions came under direct command of multi-arms brigades. At the same time the army reduced and realigned its forces and therefore the Cadore saw some changes to its composition: the 7th Alpini Regiment, 6th Mountain Artillery Regiment, and Mountain Artillery Group "Pieve di Cadore" were disbanded, while the brigade headquarters and the signal company were merged to form the Command and Signal Unit "Cadore". Additionally an anti-tank company was raised, the Light Aircraft Unit "Cadore" was transferred to the newly formed 4th Army Light Aviation Regiment "Altair" of the 4th Army Corps, the Services Grouping "Cadore" was reorganized as a logistic battalion, the Alpini Battalion "Belluno" became a training unit, and the Alpini Battalion "Val Cismon" was reduced to 264th Alpini Company "Val Cismon".

After the reform the brigade's two Alpini battalions had an authorized strength of 950 men, while the two artillery groups had an authorized strength of 610 men and fielded 18 M56 105mm pack howitzers each. The new composition was:

  Alpine Brigade "Cadore", in Belluno
  Command and Signal Unit "Cadore", in Belluno
  Alpini Battalion "Feltre", in Feltre
  Headquarters and Service Company
  64th Alpini Company
  65th Alpini Company
  66th Alpini Company
  125th Heavy Mortar Company
  Alpini Battalion "Pieve di Cadore", in Tai di Cadore
  Headquarters and Service Company
  67th Alpini Company
  68th Alpini Company
  75th Alpini Company in Santo Stefano di Cadore
  167th Heavy Mortar Company
  Alpini (Recruits Training) Battalion "Belluno", in Belluno
  Headquarters and Service Company
  92nd Alpini (Training) Company
  127th Alpini (Training) Company
  141st Alpini (Training) Company
  142nd Alpini (Training) Company
  Mountain Artillery Group "Lanzo", in Belluno
  Headquarters and Service Battery
  16th Mountain Artillery Battery
  44th Mountain Artillery Battery
  47th Mountain Artillery Battery
  Mountain Artillery Group "Agordo", in Bassano del Grappa
  Headquarters and Service Battery
  41st Mountain Artillery Battery
  42nd Mountain Artillery Battery
  43rd Mountain Artillery Battery
  Logistic Battalion "Cadore", in Belluno
  Command and Services Platoon
  1st Light Logistic Unit
  2nd Light Logistic Unit
  Medium Logistic Unit
  264th Alpini Company "Val Cismon", in Santo Stefano di Cadore (transferred on 1 November 1976 to the Alpini Battalion "Val Brenta" of the Alpine Brigade "Tridentina")
  Anti-tank Company "Cadore", in Belluno
  Engineer Company "Cadore", in Belluno

Strategic plans in case of war 

After the 1975 reform the 4th Alpine Army Corps was responsible to defend the Italian border along the main chain of the alps from the Swiss-Austrian-Italian border tripoint in the west to the Italian-Yugoslavian border in the east. In case of war with Yugoslavia the 4th Alpine Army Corps would remain static in its position guarding the left flank of the 5th Army Corps, which would meet the enemy forces in the plains of Friuli-Venezia Giulia. The only brigade which would have seen combat in such a case would have been the Julia.

In case of a war with the Warsaw Pact the 4th Alpine Army Corps had two war planes: one in the case the Soviet Southern Group of Forces and Hungarian Army would march through Yugoslavia and the other in case the Warsaw Pact would violate the Austrian neutrality and march through Austria. In case the enemy forces would come through Yugoslavia, the Julia would cover the mountainous left flank of the 5th Army Corps, which with its four armoured and five mechanized brigades would try to wear down the enemy before it could break out into the North Italian Padan plain. The other alpine brigades would remain static.

In the more likely case the Soviet and Hungarian divisions would invade Austria and march through Southern Styria and through the Drava valley in Carinthia the alpine brigades would have been the first front line units of the Italian Army. The Julia would have defended the Canal valley and the Tridentina the Puster valley, while the Orobica had a special mission and the Taurinense would remain in reserve. The Cadore was stationed between the Julia and the Tridentina brigades and tasked with defending the Piave valley. If the Soviet forces would have advanced along the Drava Valley they would have reached the Italian border at Winnebach in the Puster valley which was defended by the Alpini Battalion "Bassano" of the Tridentina. The Tridentina was tasked to defend the Puster valley, however if Soviet forces would turn south after crossing the border they would have been able to reach the Piave valley through the Sexten valley and over the Kreuzbergpass or through the Höhlensteintal and over the Cimabanche Pass. Therefore the Cadore's Alpini Battalion "Pieve di Cadore" based in Tai di Cadore was tasked with holding the Kreuzbergpass and Cimabanche pass. The "Pieve di Cadore" was supported by the Mountain Artillery Group "Lanzo" based in Belluno. The second battalion of the brigade, the Alpini Battalion "Feltre" based in Feltre along with the Mountain Artillery Group "Agordo" based in Bassano del Grappa was tasked to cover the many Dolomite mountain passes on the left flank of the "Pieve di Cadore" battalion.

To aid in the defence of the narrow mountain valleys the 4th Army Corps re-activated some fortifications of the World War II era Alpine Wall. In the area of operation of the Cadore the 264th Alpini Company "Val Cismon" based in Santo Stefano di Cadore was tasked with maintaining the Alpine Wall fortifications on the Kreuzbergpass, in the Höhlensteintal and near Prags. In wartime the fortifications would have been manned as follows:

 Kreuzbergpass: 7 bunker, 247 men from the 264th Company (Italian Wikipedia: Sbarramento Passo Monte Croce Comelico)
 Val Frison: 3 bunker, ? men from the 265th (Reserve) Company (Italian Wikipedia: Sbarramento Val Frison)
 Landro Nord: 3 bunker, 150 men from the 277th (Reserve) Company (Italian Wikipedia: Sbarramento della Val di Landro)
 Prags: 2 bunkers, 116 men from the 347th (Reserve) Company (Italian Wikipedia: Sbarramento di Braies)

Administratively the 264th Alpini Company "Val Cismon" fell under the Alpini Battalion "Val Brenta" of the Tridentina brigade. On 23 August 1986 the company was disbanded and the bunkers stripped of their equipment.

1991 Reorganization 
In 1991 the Mountain Artillery Group "Agordo" was disbanded and the remaining battalions took the names of historical Alpini regiments to carry on their traditions. Each regiment consisted of one of the brigade's Alpini battalions and an additional support company. Furthermore, the brigade's Anti-tank Company was disbanded and the Command and Signal Unit merged with the Engineer Company to form the Command and Tactical Supports Unit "Cadore". The new composition was:

  Alpine Brigade "Cadore", in Belluno
  Command and Tactical Supports Unit "Cadore", in Belluno
  7th Alpini Regiment  Alpini Battalion "Feltre", in Feltre 
  12th Alpini Regiment  Alpini Battalion "Pieve di Cadore", in Pieve di Cadore (disbanded in 1997)
  16th Alpini Regiment  Alpini (Recruits Training) Battalion "Belluno", in Belluno
  6th Mountain Artillery Regiment  Mountain Artillery Group "Lanzo", in Bassano del Grappa (disbanded on July 15, 1995)
   Logistic Battalion "Cadore", in Belluno

Today 
The brigade was disbanded on 10 January 1997 and the remaining units (7th and 16th Alpini regiments) passed to the Alpine Brigade "Julia".

Alpini brigades